Barnard is an unincorporated community in Brown County, South Dakota, United States. Although not tracked by the Census Bureau, Barnard has been assigned the ZIP Code of 57426.

History
Barnard was laid out in 1906, and named for a local resident. A post office was established at Barnard in 1910.

Demographics
The population in Barnard is 36. There are 5 people per square mile. The median age in Barnard is 57.3. The number of people per household in Barnard is 2.1.

Family in Barnard
- 72.9% are married
- 0.0% are divorced
- 27.3% are married with children
- 0.0% have children, but are single

Race in Barnard
- 100.0% are white
- 0.0% are black
- 0.0% are asian
- 0.0% are native american
- 0.0% claim Other

References

Unincorporated communities in Brown County, South Dakota
Unincorporated communities in South Dakota
Aberdeen, South Dakota micropolitan area